Hernán Leopoldo Raffo Abarca (2 July 1929 – 24 July 2012) was a Chilean basketball player. He competed in the men's tournament at the 1948 Summer Olympics, the 1952 Summer Olympics and the 1956 Summer Olympics.

References

External links

1929 births
2012 deaths
Chilean men's basketball players
1954 FIBA World Championship players
Olympic basketball players of Chile
Basketball players at the 1948 Summer Olympics
Basketball players at the 1952 Summer Olympics
Basketball players at the 1956 Summer Olympics
Sportspeople from Valparaíso